Griffith's Valuation was a boundary and land valuation survey of Ireland completed in 1868.

Griffith's background
Richard John Griffith started to value land in Scotland, where he spent two years in 1806-1807 valuing terrain through the examination of its soils. He used 'the Scotch system of valuation' and it was a modified version of this that he introduced into Ireland when he assumed the position of Commissioner of Valuation.

Tasks in Ireland
In 1825 Griffith was appointed by the British Government to carry out a boundary survey of Ireland. He was to mark the boundaries of every county, barony, civil parish, and townland in tandem with the first Ordnance Survey of Ireland.  He completed the boundary work in 1844. He was also called upon to assist in the preparation of a Parliamentary bill to provide for the general valuation of Ireland. This act was passed in 1826 and Griffith was appointed Commissioner of Valuation in 1827, but did not start work until 1830 when the new 6-inch Ordnance Survey maps required by the statute became available.

Griffith served as Commissioner until 1868, when he was succeeded by Sir John Ball Greene, who took charge of the ongoing revisions of the valuation on an annual basis. Griffith also served as Chairman of the Board of Works. He conducted two major valuation surveys. First was the townland valuation, which was completed in the 1840s and which took the townland as the geographical unit of valuation. The second and more extensive was the tenement survey which valued individual property separately for the first time and which also valued all buildings in the townland for the first time, whereas only the larger houses, principally those of the gentry, had been valued in the first valuation. The tenement valuations of County Dublin were the first to be published on 5 May 1853 and the last were the valuations of County Armagh on 1 June 1865.

Contemporary use of and dates of valuation

The valuation is a vital document in genealogical research, since in the absence of census records in Ireland before 1901 the valuation records in many ways can act as a substitute.  It is helpful in this to know the precise dates when the individual county components of the survey were completed, as follows:

References

External links
 Search Griffith's Valuation on Ask about Ireland website
 Is There More in Griffith's Valuation Than Just Names?

1868 in Ireland
Geographic history of Ireland